The NCW Triple Crown Championship was a title contested in the Canadian wrestling promotion Northern Championship.  It was created on December 15, 2007 when the NCW X-Treme Championship and NCW Cruiserweight Championship were unified in a 6-way ladder match.  It was retired on October 15, 2016 upon James Stone winning the title.

Title history

Combined reigns

See also
NCW Inter-Cities Heavyweight Championship

Triple Crown Championship
2007 establishments in Quebec
2016 disestablishments in Quebec